Walter Reyno (13 February 1935 – 3 December 2014) was a Uruguayan actor and theater director. He was known for his roles in 25 Watts and El aura. 

Reyno was born in Montevideo, Uruguay and died there from respiratory failure, aged 79.

Filmography 
Dormir al sol (2012)
Cruz del Sur (2011) ... Walter
El pájaro de Comala (cortometraje, 2008) ... Actor
La cáscara (2007) ... Manuel
Matar a todos (2007) ... General Gudari
El cojonudo (cortometraje, 2005) ... Don Dogomar
El aura (2005) ... Montero
Alma mater (2004) ... Man with hat
La espera (2002) ... Modesto
El ojo en la nuca (cortometraje, 2001) ... General Díaz
25 Watts (2001) ... Don Héctor
Mi querido hereje (1999)
Un crisantemo estalla en cinco esquinas (1998) ... El Zancudo
Otario (1997) 
Patrón (1995)
Viento del Uruguay (1989)
El lugar del humo (1978)

References

External links
 

1935 births
2014 deaths
Deaths from respiratory failure
Uruguayan male film actors
Uruguayan theatre directors
Male actors from Montevideo
20th-century Uruguayan male actors
21st-century Uruguayan male actors